Handel is a special service area in Grandview No. 349, Saskatchewan, Canada. The population was 25 at the time of the 2006 Census. The community is located approximately 45 km directly west of the town of Biggar on Highway 51.

History
Prior to January 31, 2007, Handel was a village, but it was restructured as a hamlet on that date.

Demographics 

See also 

 List of communities in Saskatchewan
 List of villages in Saskatchewan

References

Designated places in Saskatchewan
Grandview No. 349, Saskatchewan
Former villages in Saskatchewan
Special service areas in Saskatchewan
Populated places disestablished in 2007
Division No. 13, Saskatchewan

nl:Handel